Cymodusa is a genus of parasitoid wasps in the family Ichneumonidae.

 Names brought to synonymy 
 Cymodusa elegans Szepligeti, 1901, a synonym for Nemeritis elegans

References

External links 
 

 
 Cymodusa at insectoid.info

Ichneumonidae genera
Campopleginae